Sorbus randaiensis is a deciduous tree of family Rosaceae. It is an endemic species in Taiwan and can be found in the mountain areas of middle Taiwan, with altitude 1,800m to 3,200m, mostly spotted in the forest of Xueshan, Hehuan Mountain, and Nenggao Mountain. It is a tree 3–8 m tall with white flowers and reddish fruit.

Naming 
It was first described as Pyrus aucuparia var. randaiensis by Bunzō Hayata in 1911,  then placed in Sorbus by Gen'ichi Koidzumi in 1913.

Its species epithet randaiensis implies that the first type specimen was collected at Mount Xiluan.

Description 
Deciduous trees with obvious lenticel on the branches.

Leaf 
Alternate, odd number pinnate leaves, with leaflets 15–21. Leaflets without petiole, shaped from long oval to lanceolate, 3–4 cm in length, 8–12 cm in width. The front end tapered, and the basal part skew, circled or obtuse. Margin jagged. Petiole with groove, and with short furs when young.

Flower 
Terminal corymbs inflorescence. Pedicels are short, about 3–4 mm in length. Petals 5, white. Hypanthium with long furs, triangle shaped. Stamens 15–20, Carpels 3–5, isolated. Styles 3–5, isolated or basal synthetic. Flower perigynous.

Fruit 
Schizocarp, berry-like, globular with diameter 7 mm. The front end has the remaining traces of stigma and calyx. Turn rubine at maturation.

Phenology 
First leaf for the spring sprouts during April to May. Inflorescence is on about May to June. Around September to October, their fruits ripen with rubine color. And in the October to November, their leaves turn yellow or red before falling down.

Uses

Medicine 
Its fruit, stem, and bark can be used as medicine. Although tasting bitter, it is a cure for chronic bronchitis and cough with phlegm, and is spleen-tonifying.

Ornamental 
It is eye-catching with their beautifully-shaped appearance from branching to flowers, especially the amazing change of leaves to red and rubine fruits in October.

Food 
The fruits are with juicy texture and sweetness, tasting delicious.

Notes

References 

 台灣植物資訊整合查詢系統
 雪霸國家公園全球資訊網

External links 
 

randaiensis
Endemic flora of Taiwan
Trees of Taiwan
Plants described in 1911
Taxa named by Bunzō Hayata